Sonu Kyong-sun  (born 28 September 1983) is a North Korean football defender who played for the North Korea women's national football team at the 2008 Summer Olympics. At the club level, she played for April 25.

See also
 North Korea at the 2008 Summer Olympics

References

External links
 
 Profile at sports-reference.com

1983 births
Living people
North Korean women's footballers
Place of birth missing (living people)
Footballers at the 2008 Summer Olympics
Olympic footballers of North Korea
Women's association football defenders
Asian Games medalists in football
Footballers at the 2006 Asian Games
North Korea women's international footballers
Asian Games gold medalists for North Korea
Medalists at the 2006 Asian Games
2007 FIFA Women's World Cup players